The Caledonian Curling Club (also known as the Callie Curling Club) has been one of the most prominent curling rinks in Canada for many years. The club was established on October 14, 1915. Since its beginning so many years ago, the club has produced many provincial, national, and even Olympic champions. It's also open to the public.

History
On 7 October 1915, curlers gathered in Slater and Finlayson's store to discuss prospects for the formation of a second curling club in Regina. It was agreed that a second club would not only prove beneficial in the interests of curling in the city, but the additional rink would provide better accommodation for the Provincial Bonspiel. The club was officially established on the day of 14 October 1915 when it was given the name of The Caledonian Curling Club of Regina. C. J. Watson, who had chaired the meetings and also named the first president of the club.

References

External links

Curling clubs in Canada
1915 establishments in Saskatchewan
Sport in Regina, Saskatchewan